The Blues and Other Colors is an album by saxophonist James Moody recorded in 1968 and 1969 and released on the Milestone label.

Reception

Scott Yanow of Allmusic states, "Best known for his tenor and alto playing (although he is also recognized as a talented flutist), Moody is here heard exclusively on soprano and flute... Moody plays quite well and sounds surprisingly effective on soprano, an instrument he would rarely return to in the future".

Track listing 
All compositions by James Moody except as indicated
 "Main Stem" (Duke Ellington) - 3:37
 "Everyone Needs It" - 4:06
 "Savannah Calling" - 4:14
 "A Statement" - 5:17
 "Gone Are the Days" (Stephen Foster) - 3:03
 "Feeling Low" - 4:53
 "You Got to Pay" (Tom McIntosh) - 3:22
 "Old Folks" (Dedette Lee Hill, Willard Robison) - 5:49

Personnel 
James Moody - soprano saxophone, flute
Tom McIntosh - trombone, arranger, conductor
Johnny Coles - trumpet (tracks 1-4 & 8)
Britt Woodman - trombone (tracks 5-7)
Jim Buffington - French horn (tracks 5-7)
Joe Farrell - alto flute, oboe, alto saxophone (tracks 1-4 & 8)
Cecil Payne - baritone saxophone (tracks 1-4 & 8)
Kenny Barron (tracks 1-4 & 8), Dick Katz (tracks 5-7) - piano 
Alfred Brown - viola (tracks 5-7)
Charles McCracken, Kermit Moore - cello (tracks 5-7)
Ron Carter (tracks 1 & 4-8), Ben Tucker (tracks 2 & 3) - bass, electric bass
Connie Kay (tracks 5-7), Freddie Waits (tracks 1-4 & 8) - drums
Linda November - vocals (tracks 5-7)

References 

James Moody (saxophonist) albums
1969 albums
Milestone Records albums
Albums arranged by Tom McIntosh
Albums produced by Orrin Keepnews